The 2018–19 Armenian Cup was the 28th edition of the football knockout competition in Armenia. This season's cup winners earned a place in the 2019–20 Europa League. The tournament began on 19 September 2018 and ended on 7 May 2019.

Gandzasar Kapan were the defending champions after defeating Alashkert on penalties in the previous season's final.

Format
The Armenian Football Cup this season was contested between twelve clubs over four rounds. The final was a single match which determined the cup winner, all other rounds were played over two legs.

First round

Quarter–finals

Semi–finals

Final

Scorers

6 goals:
 Anton Kobyalko - Ararat-Armenia

3 goals:
 Uguchukwu Iwu - Lori

2 goals:

 Kayron - Ararat-Armenia
 Charles Monsalvo - Ararat-Armenia
 Adamu Abdullahi - Banants
 Nwankwo Francis - Lori
 Armen Durunts - Junior Sevan

1 goals:

 Jefferson - Alashkert
 Hrayr Mkoyan - Alashkert
 Sargis Shahinyan - Alashkert
 Artak Yedigaryan - Alashkert
 Zhirayr Shagoyan - Ararat-Armenia
 Vladimir Khozin - Ararat-Armenia
 Ruslan Avagyan - Ararat Yerevan
 Zaven Badoyan - Ararat Yerevan
 Garegin Kirakosyan - Ararat Yerevan
 Dmitri Malyaka - Ararat Yerevan
 Pape Demba Dieye - Ararat Yerevan
 Grigor Aghekyan - Artsakh
 Sarkis Baloyan - Artsakh
 Emil Yeghiazaryan - Artsakh
 Akmal Bakhtiyarov - Artsakh
 Aram Loretsyan - Banants
 Erik Petrosyan - Banants
 Gevorg Nranyan - Gandzasar Kapan
 Yaroslav Shatalin - Junior Sevan
 Yegor Sysuyev - Junior Sevan
 Karapet Manukyan - Lokomotiv Yerevan
 Aram Adamyan - Lori
 Areg Azatyan - Lori
 Sunday Ingbede - Lori
 Alik Arakelyan - Pyunik
 Henri Junior Ndong - Shirak
 Roman Zavialov - Yerevan

Own goals:
 Dmitri Malyaka (19 September 2018 vs Lokomotiv Yerevan)
 Fyodor Limonov (3 October 2018 vs Ararat-Armenia)
 Kódjo (3 April 2019 vs Alashkert)
 Ubong Friday (8 May 2019 vs Alashkert)

See also
 2018–19 Armenian Premier League

References

External links
 Official site

Armenian Cup seasons
Armenian Cup
Cup